The Eswatini national basketball team represents Eswatini in international competitions. It is administrated by the Basketball Association of Eswatini (BASE).

Eswatini joined the International Federation of Basketball (FIBA) in 2000 and is Africa's youngest member.

Competitions

Performance at Summer Olympics
yet to qualify

Performance at World championships
yet to qualify

Performance at FIBA Africa Championship
yet to qualify

See also

Eswatini national under-17 basketball team
Eswatini women's national under-17 basketball team

External links
Presentation on Facebook

References

Men's national basketball teams
Eswatini men's national basketball team
Basketball in Eswatini
2000 establishments in Swaziland